Las Golondrinas is a territory of Ecuador.

References 

 

Provinces of Ecuador
Imbabura Province